Ahmad is the debut album by Ahmad. It was released on May 24, 1994, by Giant/Reprise.

Track listing
"Freak"
"Back in the Day"
"Touch the Ceiling"
"The Jones'"
"Can I Party?"
"You Gotta Be..."
"We Want the Funk"
"The Palladium"
"Homeboys First"
"Ordinary People"
"Back in the Day" [Remix]
"Back in the Day" [Jeep Mix]

Charts

References

1994 debut albums
West Coast hip hop albums
Giant Records (Warner) albums